Yoshimoto v Canterbury Golf International Ltd [2004] 1 NZLR 1 is a frequently cited case in NZ regarding contract construction.

References

New Zealand contract case law